John Stachel (born 29 March 1928) is an American physicist and philosopher of science.

Biography
Stachel earned his PhD at Stevens Institute of Technology in Physics about a topic in General relativity in 1958. After holding different teaching positions at Lehigh University and the University of Pittsburgh, he went 1964 to Boston University where he was professor of physics until his emeritation.

In 1977, Stachel became the first editor of the Einstein Papers Project, then at Boston University. The first two volumes (out of a projected twenty-five) of The Collected Papers of Albert Einstein were published during his tenure.

He is head of the Boston University Center for Einstein Studies and, together with Don Howard, publishes the book series Einstein Studies.

Stachel also authored a text, entitled Einstein: From 'B' to 'Z'. In 2005 he delivered the British Academy's Master-Mind Lecture.

Bibliography (selection) 
 A. Einstein; J. Stachel, D.C. Cassidy, et al., eds., The Collected Papers of Albert Einstein, Vol. 1: The Early Years, 1879-1902, Princeton University Press 1987, 
 A. Einstein; J. Stachel, D.C. Cassidy, et al., eds., The Collected Papers of Albert Einstein, Vol. 2: The Swiss Years: Writings, 1900-1909, Princeton University Press 1989, 
 A. Ashtekar, J. Stachel, eds., Conceptual Problems of Quantum Gravity, Springer 1991, 
 D. Howard, J. Stachel, Einstein, The Formative Years 1879-1909, Birkhäuser 2000, 
 J. Stachel, 'Einstein from 'B' to 'Z' '', Birkhauser 2002, 
 A. Ashtekar et al., eds., Revisiting the Foundations of Relativistic Physics: Festschrift in Honor of John Stachel, Kluwer 2003,

See also 
 Point-coincidence argument

References

External links 
 Homepage
 Papers & Presentations
 Brief CV

1928 births
Living people
American relativity theorists
Quantum gravity physicists
Stevens Institute of Technology alumni
Lehigh University faculty
University of Pittsburgh faculty
Boston University faculty
Historians of physics